Umm Ghuwailina is a village in Qatar located in the municipality of Al-Shahaniya.

Etymology
In Arabic, "umm" is translated to "mother", and is a common prefix that is attached to a name in order to signify a geographical feature. The second constituent is derived from "ghulan", the Arabic name for a local plant. Ghulan is part of the Hammada genus of plants and is commonly used as fodder for camels.

Agriculture
The Umm Ghuwailina Green Fodder Project was launched in April 2018. The project, located on an area of 191 hectares, is estimated to produce 2,700 to 3,000 tonnes of clover per year for use as fodder. Al-Baida Group developed and is overseeing the project with the assistance of government authorities. It is part of the many government-supported initiatives to increase Qatar's food self-sufficiency.

References

Populated places in Al-Shahaniya